Ricardo Santos may refer to:

 Ricardo Santos (beach volleyball), Brazilian beach volleyball player
 Ricardo Santos (footballer, born 1987), Brazilian footballer
 Ricardo Santos (golfer), Portuguese golfer
 Ricardo Santos (sailor), Brazilian windsurfer
 Ricardo Santos (footballer, born 1995), Portuguese footballer